= Vegdi River =

Vegdi

Location
- Country: India
- State: Gujarat

Physical characteristics
- Source
  - location: India
- Mouth
  - location: Arabian Sea, India
- Length: 26 km (16 mi)
- Discharge
  - location: Arabian Sea

Vegdi River is a river in western India in Gujarat whose origin is near Bhervi village. Its basin has a maximum length of 26 km. The total catchment area of the basin is 119 km2.
